Korikovo is a rural locality (a village) in Lyakhovskoye Rural Settlement, Melenkovsky District, Vladimir Oblast, Russia. The population was 30 as of 2010. There are 2 streets.

Geography 
Korikovo is located on the Dubrovka River, 23 km east of Melenki (the district's administrative centre) by road. Vysokovo is the nearest rural locality.

References 

Rural localities in Melenkovsky District